Romodan Mohammed Nur was an Eritrean politician who was the first chairman of the Eritrean People's Liberation Front and a key figure during the Eritrean War of Independence

Early and personal life
Romodan was born in Hirghigo in 1941 to a Tigre speaking merchant family. He attended Kekiya School, and in 1957 went to Cairo for secondary school.

Rebel fighter
In 1961 he joined the ELF, and in 1963 Romodan went to receive military training in Syria. He rose to become political commissar of Zone 4 in 1965, and was one of the original group of five sent for training in China in 1967. In 1970, Romodan was among the founders of the People's Liberation Forces (PLF) at Sudoha Ila, and in 1971 he was elected to lead the PLF, after which he developed close links to the Ala group led by his colleague, Isaias. Together with Isaias and others, Romodan created the nucleus of what was to become the EPLF within the Eritrean Liberation Forces – People's Liberation Forces (ELF-PLF). At the EPLF's First Congress in 1977, he was elected secretary general – a position he held until 1987, when he became vice secretary-general, with Isaias's assumption of public leadership.

Later life
In 1994, Romodan suddenly resigned as vice secretary general of the EPLF possibly due to pressure from Isaias Afwerki. He then lived a quiet civilian life and died on December 30, 2021.

References

1941 births
2021 deaths
Eritrean politicians
People from Northern Red Sea Region
Eritrean Muslims